Madly is a 2016 English-language international anthology film. The film notably features an international cast and crew from countries such as Australia, Chile, India, Japan, Mexico, and the United Kingdom.

Cast

Reception
David Ehrlich of Indie Wire said that "The film, like love itself, is inconsistent and hard to define. The film, like love itself, is also hard to resist". Kenji Fushima of Slant Magazine wrote that "Madly broadly tackles the subject of love without, even at its least successful, stooping to the dire, barrel-scraping cultural condescension of Rio, I Love You". Jay Weissberg of Variety opined that "Like most compilation projects, the effort yields an uneven anthology with little thematic glue holding it together, although for the most part, the six shorts could stand alone and overall quality is high". Frank Scheck of The Hollywood Reporter wrote that "Uneven in the way of so many cinematic anthologies, this is a more artistically ambitious collection than most, even if its aspirations aren’t always fulfilled". Patricia Contino of The Upcoming opined that "On the whole Madly is an ambitious project of compelling filmmaking and storytelling – and instead of one worthwhile film, there are several!"

Accolades

References

External links
 

2016 films
2016 romantic drama films
2010s English-language films
American anthology films
American romantic drama films
Australian anthology films
Australian romantic drama films
British anthology films
British romantic drama films
Indian anthology films
Indian romantic drama films
Argentine anthology films
Argentine romantic drama films
Japanese anthology films
Japanese romantic drama films
2010s American films
2010s British films
2010s Japanese films
2010s Argentine films